The Double Face is a 1920 German silent film directed by Mutz Greenbaum.

Cast
 Rolf Loer as Phantomas

References

Bibliography

External links

1920 films
Fantômas films
Films directed by Mutz Greenbaum
Films of the Weimar Republic
German black-and-white films
German silent feature films